The Yizhuang Line of the Beijing Subway is a rapid transit line that connects the Yizhuang Development Area with Beijing's subway network. It runs from Songjiazhuang in Fengtai District to Yizhuang Railway Station in Tongzhou District and passes through the southern Chaoyang and northern Daxing Districts. Total investment for the line was estimated at ¥1.2 billion. Construction began on December 8, 2007 and the line opened on December 30, 2010.

List of stations

History

Accidents and Incidents 
On March 26, 2015, train YZ021 was testing when it derailed around Taihu. No passengers were on board and the driver faced leg injuries.

Future development 
In 8 July 2022, an EIA document regarding Phase III construction of Beijing rail transport system (2022–2027) announced to reform the connection tracks between Yizhuang line, the line 5 and the line 10, so that trains of Yizhuang line can operate through trains with lines 5 and 10. It will require a maximum of  new tracks near Songjiazhuang train depot, between Songjiazhuang stations of Yizhuang line and line 5, and Chengshousi station of line 10, it will also require to rebuild 0.5 km tracks for train storages within Songjiazhuang depot.

Rolling Stock

References

Beijing Subway lines
Railway lines opened in 2010
2010 establishments in China
750 V DC railway electrification